The intertransverse ligaments are ligaments that are placed between the transverse processes of the spine.

In the cervical region they consist of a few irregular, scattered fibers that are often replaced by muscles. In the thoracic region they are rounded cords intimately connected with the deep muscles of the back. In the lumbar region they are thin and membranous.

The intertransverse ligaments often blend with the intertransverse muscles.

The function of the intertransverse ligaments is to limit lateral flexion of the spine.

References

External links

Ligaments of the torso